The Asian barred owlet (Glaucidium cuculoides) is a species of true owl, resident in northern parts of the Indian Subcontinent and parts of Southeast Asia. It ranges across north central and northeast India, Nepal, Bhutan, northern Bangladesh, and southeast Asia (Myanmar, Thailand, Cambodia, Laos, Vietnam). Its natural habitat is temperate forest.

References

External links

 
 
 
 
 
 

Asian barred owlet
Birds of China
Birds of the Himalayas
Birds of Northeast India
Birds of Southeast Asia
Asian barred owlet
Taxa named by Nicholas Aylward Vigors
Taxonomy articles created by Polbot